Elif Doğan Türkmen (born 1 January 1962) is a Turkish politician from the Republican People's Party (CHP), who has served as a Member of Parliament for Adana since 7 June 2015.

Born in Adana, Türkmen graduated from Ankara University Faculty of Law and worked as a lawyer in Adana. Coming from a traditionally social democrat family, she had previously been involved in SODEP and was a founding member of the Social Democratic Populist Party (SHP) Women's wing. She joined the CHP after the latter two parties were dissolved. She has been involved in many projects to help women and development in Adana, with some backed by the European Union. Married with one child, she was elected as a CHP Member of Parliament in the June 2015 general election. During the election campaign, she was shot and injured by one of her clients. The attack was described as a scare tactic and not to cause fatal injury.

See also
25th Parliament of Turkey

References

External links
 Collection of all relevant news items at Haberler.com
 Collection of all relevant news items at Son Dakika

Contemporary Republican People's Party (Turkey) politicians
Deputies of Adana
Members of the 25th Parliament of Turkey
Living people
People from Adana
1962 births
Social Democracy Party (Turkey) politicians
20th-century Turkish politicians
Members of the 26th Parliament of Turkey